The Motor Museum (previously called the Pink Museum) is a music recording studio based in Liverpool, England, and owned by Andy McCluskey of Orchestral Manoeuvres in the Dark (OMD). A number of popular music artists have recorded at the premises, including Oasis, The La's, The Coral, Ben Howard, Jake Bugg, The 1975, Atomic Kitten, Tom Odell and Tribes. Music producer Mike Crossey used it as a base for recording the Arctic Monkeys and Blood Red Shoes.

In 2012, Al Groves took over as the Motor Museum's resident producer. Already an established producer on the Liverpool music scene, he has continued the work of establishing the Motor Museum's reputation as one of the most desirable recording locations in the UK, having worked with artists like The Tea Street Band and Bring Me the Horizon.

In addition to the usual array of equipment typical of most professional recording environments, the Motor Museum has a number of special features which have been credited with giving both the creative and recording process a unique edge, including its stone room, which adds unique ambient quality to recordings, especially those of drums. The effect of the stone room can be heard on many of the tracks recorded at the Motor Museum, such as at the start of “Supersonic” by Oasis.

References

Recording studios in England
Buildings and structures in Liverpool
Companies based in Liverpool